Ansuya Blom (born 1956) is a Dutch artist.

In 2020 she received the Heineken Prize for Art. 
Her work is included in the collections of the Stedelijk Museum Amsterdam and the Tate Gallery.

References

Living people
20th-century Dutch women artists
21st-century Dutch women artists
1956 births